Jawahar Navodaya Vidyalaya, Kannur is a residential school in Kannur District in the state of Kerala, established in 1986–87. It comes under the Hyderabad Region of Navodaya Vidyalaya Samiti (NVS).

Jawahar Navodaya Vidyalayas are Indian residential schools for talented children that follow CBSE Curriculum with the three-language formula (English, Hindi, and Regional Language (Malayalam)).  They form a part of the system of gifted education. The objectives of the scheme were to provide good quality modern education to talented children predominantly from the rural areas, without regard to their family's socio-economic condition.

The entire area is made up of laterite rock. No major vegetation is found except a few cashew trees. Yet the site is apt for the functioning of the school. The approach road is from Valliyayi Desam about  down the hill.

Admissions
Students are admitted to the VIth Standard through a test called Jawahar Navodaya Vidyalaya Selection Test (JNVST). Only those students who are currently studying in Vth standard in Government/Aided Schools and Government Recognized Schools are eligible to apply for the test. Another test called Lateral Entry Selection Test (LEST) for admissions to IXth standard is also conducted by the CBSE to accommodate students who wish to join Navodaya Schools, subject to the availability of vacant seats in IXth standard. Lateral Entry is also made for class XI admission.

Gallery

References

Jawahar Navodaya Vidyalayas in Kerala
Schools in Kannur district
1986 establishments in Kerala
Educational institutions established in 1986